2009–10 Moldovan National Division season is the 4th Moldovan National Division season in the history of FC CSCA–Rapid Ghidighici.

Current squad 
Squad given according to the official website as of June 6, 2010

Current squad

National Division results

References 

Moldovan football clubs 2009–10 season